Bid Khun (also Romanized as Bīd Khūn, Bīdakhun, and Bid Khoon) is a village in Asaluyeh Rural District of the Central District of Asaluyeh County, Bushehr province, Iran. At the 2006 census, its population was 1,890 in 461 households when it was in the former Asaluyeh District of Kangan County. The following census in 2011 counted 5,269 people in 1,305 households. The latest census in 2016 showed a population of 8,886 people in 2,071 households, by which time it was in Asaluyeh Rural District of the new Asaluyeh County; it was the largest village in its rural district.

References 

Populated places in Asaluyeh County